Pains  is a bairro in the District of Pains in the municipality of Santa Maria, in the Brazilian state of Rio Grande do Sul. It is located in southest Santa Maria.

Villages 
The bairro contains the following villages: Pains, São Sebastião, Passo das Topas, Vila Abrantes, Vila Videira, Vila Marques, Sítio dos Paines, São Geraldo.

Gallery of photos

References 

Bairros of Santa Maria, Rio Grande do Sul